"La Derrota" ("The Defeat") is the title of a song written and produced by Mexican singer-songwriter Joan Sebastian and recorded by Mexican performer Vicente Fernández. It was released as the second single from Fernández's 79th studio album Para Siempre.

This single was a successful release, peaking at number seven in the Billboard Hot Latin Songs in United States and reaching the top spot of the charts in México and Colombia.

Song information
"La Derrota" is included on the 79th studio album by Vicente Fernández titled Para Siempre and was chosen to be the second single from this album. It debuted at number 
29 in the Billboard Latin Regional Mexican Airplay on February 9, 2008, where it peaked at the top of the chart 15 weeks later, and went on to spend 29 weeks in the chart. On the Billboard Hot Latin Songs the single peaked at number 7 and spent 22 weeks within the Top 40. It also peaked at number one in México and Colombia.

"Estos Celos" ranked 15th at the Billboard Regional Mexican Songs Year-End Charts of 2008. It also ranked at number 25 at the Hot Latin Songs recap of 2008.

Chart performance

Personnel
The following people contributed to "La Derrota":

Joan Sebastían — Guitar, arranger, producer
Miguel Trujillo — Executive producer
Dennis Parker — Engineer/mixer, mastering engineer
Rigoberto Alfaro — Arranger  
Manuel Cázarez — Arranger  
Mara Esquivel — A&R
Javier Alfaro — Violin

Dave Rivera — Violin  
Javier Carrillo — Violin  
Hugo Colula — Violin  
Francisco Cedillo — Viola
Monica Del Aguila — Cello
Bernardino De Santiago — Guitarrón
Moisés Garcia — Trumpet

References

2008 singles
Vicente Fernández songs
Spanish-language songs
Songs written by Joan Sebastian
Sony BMG Norte singles
2008 songs